Ypsolopha tesselatidorsata is a moth of the family Ypsolophidae. It is known from the Russian Far East.

The length of the forewings is 6.8–7.8 mm.

Etymology
The specific name tesselatidorsata is derived from the Latin tesselatus (meaning checkered) and dorsum (meaning back), in concordance with the pattern of the forewing dorsal half.

References

Ypsolophidae
Moths of Asia